Fernando Báez (born San Félix, Ciudad Guayana, Venezuela) is a Venezuelan writer, poet, essayist and "El Director de la Biblioteca Nacional de Venezuela". He is known for his work on the destruction of Iraqi books and art caused by the invasion of Iraq in 2003.

Career
Báez has a degree in education and a doctorate in library science, and worked for several years at the University of the Andes in Mérida, Venezuela, where he studied Greek and Latin under José Manuel Briceño Guerrero. He was declared a persona non-grata by the United States authorities, after the publication of his book on Iraq.

Works 
 Historia de la Antigua Biblioteca de Alejandría (2003)
 Historia Universal de la Destrucción de Libros (2004)
 La Destrucción Cultural de Iraq (2004)

Novels
 

Translations

See also 
 Destruction of libraries
 Book burning

References

External links 
 https://web.archive.org/web/20120331102541/http://www.fernandobaez.galeon.com/
 https://independent.academia.edu/FernandoBaez

Venezuelan male poets
Venezuelan essayists
Male essayists
Living people
Year of birth missing (living people)